The Lancia Aprilia (1937–1949) is a family car manufactured by Lancia, one of the first designed using wind tunnel in collaboration with Battista Farina and Politecnico di Torino,  achieving a record low drag coefficient of 0.47. The berlinetta aerodinamica was first shown in 1936.

Production commenced in February 1937, the month in which the firm's founder died: this was the last of Vincenzo Lancia's designs, featuring four pillarless doors. The first series (mod. 238, 10,354 units, 1937–39) featured a 1,352 cc V4 motor providing . The second series (mod. 438, 9,728 units, 1939–49) had its engine capacity increased to 1,486 cc which provided . A Lusso model of this second series was also offered as well as a lungo (lengthened) version (706 made, 1946–49). A total of 20,082 cars and 7,554 additional chassis for coach built bodies were produced in Turin along with about 700 in France.

With the Aprilia Lancia followed their tradition of offering cars with the steering wheel on the right even in markets seen by other manufacturers as left hand drive markets. Outside the UK and Sweden customers increasingly picked the optional left hand drive versions, however.

Special designs include those by Ugo Zagato (1938), a Carrozzeria Touring convertible, the army's Torpedo militare (World War II), a Luigi Pagani-tuned barchetta bodied by boatbuilders Riva di Merate on a pre-war chassis (1946), a Bertone convertible (1947), one of Michelotti's first, while at Vignale (1949).

French assembly
Lancia had opened their first plant outside Italy at Bonneuil on the south side of Paris in 1931, and the Aprilia was assembled here between 1937 and 1939. The French version was badged as the Lancia Ardennes, but apart from the name and slightly larger headlights (possibly to compensate for the dimming effects of French legislation requiring headlight bulbs to be yellow) the French Lancia Ardennes was indistinguishable from the Turin built Lancia Aprilia. Curiously, the models assembled in France made it to the market ahead of the Italian cars, being sold from Autumn 1936, whereas the Italian cars were not sold till early 1937, after the worst of the winter was over. Despite being well regarded by enthusiasts, the Lancia Ardennes was overshadowed in the French market place by the pioneering and aggressively priced Citroën Traction. In the context of heightened nationalism and increasing political tension between the political classes in Italy and in France, only 1,620 Lancia Ardennes models had been produced before war put an end to its production.

In popular culture
The Lancia Aprilia is featured in Land of Black Gold, one of The Adventures of Tintin, in the story's car chase scene. Driven by Tintin with Captain Haddock and Snowy as passengers, they chased the villain Prof. Smith, alias Dr. Müller, who kidnapped Prince Abdullah and tried to run away in the desert.

See also
Lancia Augusta

References



External links

 Lancisti.net - An Information Exchange and Support Community for Lancia Owners and Enthusiasts

Aprilia
1940s cars
Cars introduced in 1937
Mid-size cars
Sedans
Convertibles